Amaryllididae is a family of marine benthic amphipods found throughout the southern hemisphere. These smooth, laterally compressed amphipods can be distinguished by the accessory setal row of the mandible having a distal tuft. It was first described in 2002 by James K. Lowry and Helen E. Stoddart. It contains the following genera:
Amaryllis Haswell, 1879
Bamarooka Lowry & Stoddart, 2002
Bathyamaryllis Pirlot, 1933
Bertoliella
Devo Lowry & Stoddart, 2002
Erikus Lowry & Stoddart, 1987
Pseudamaryllis Andres, 1981
Vijaya Walker, 1904
Wonga Lowry & Stoddart, 2002

References

Gammaridea
Crustacean genera
Crustaceans described in 2002
Taxa named by James K. Lowry